Georgy Khasakoyevich Dzugayev (1911 - 1986) was an Ossetian writer. He was captured during World War II and became a prisoner of war; he escaped in February 1945 and fought with the Red Army. After the war, he worked with the Ossetic language magazine Herald until his death.

1911 births
1986 deaths
Ossetian writers
Soviet writers